One ship of the Royal Navy and one planned one have borne the name HMS Danube, after the Danube, a river in central and eastern Europe:

 was a wooden paddle vessel purchased in 1854 and sold in 1856.
She was ordered in 1861 and cancelled in 1863.

Royal Navy ship names